Chandrabadani is a mountain (2,277m above sea-level). On the border of Devaprayag tehsil and Pratapnagar tehsil is the well known temple of Chandrabadni Devi, lying at the top of the mountain about 10 km. north of Kandi Khal ( a place on the Devaprayag-Kirti Nagar metalled road).

In Indian mythology
The legend says that the torso of Sati fell here and her weapons got scattered all around the place. Thus, even today huge number of iron trishuls (tridents) and some old statues can be seen lying around the revered temple of Chandrabadani.

Sight-seeing 
The place has views of the Surkanda, Kedarnath and Badrinath peaks. The temple is small and contains a Shri-yantra carved out on a flat stone instead of any idol. Traditionally, a cloth canopy is tied to the ceiling over this Shri-yantra once a year and the Brahmana priest doing it has to do it blind-folded.

Access
By road, one can reach Jamnikhal which is about 31 km from Devprayag by road and 109 km from Narendra Nagar. From Jamnikhal it is a 7 km plus one km walk uphill to Chandrabadani Temple. Nearest railhead is at Rishikesh and nearest airport is Jolly Grant of Dehradun.

References

External links
 मां चंद्रवदनी मंदिर को बद्री-केदार की तरह धाम के रूप में मान्यता दिलाने की मुहिम 
 https://web.archive.org/web/20171222052541/http://02infinit.blogspot.in/2017/11/blog-post_20.html
 chandarbadani Mandir sampuran 

Hindu temples in Uttarakhand
Tehri Garhwal district